The men's Greco-Roman +100 kg at the 1972 Summer Olympics as part of the wrestling program at the Fairgrounds, Judo and Wrestling Hall.

Medalists

Tournament results 
The competition used a form of negative points tournament, with negative points given for any result short of a fall. Accumulation of 6 negative points eliminated the wrestler. When only two or three wrestlers remain, a special final round is used to determine the order of the medals.

Legend
DNA — Did not appear
TPP — Total penalty points
MPP — Match penalty points

Penalties
0 — Won by Fall, Passivity, Injury and Forfeit
0.5 — Won by Technical Superiority
1 — Won by Points
2 — Draw
2.5 — Draw, Passivity
3 — Lost by Points
3.5 — Lost by Technical Superiority
4 — Lost by Fall, Passivity, Injury and Forfeit

Round 1 
In the freestyle super heavyweight, Chris Taylor was controversially defeated by eventual gold medalist Alexander Medved. It appeared Medved was stalling but the referee awarded a point to the Soviet, charging Taylor with a lack of action. Later admitting that he felt sorry for Medved because of Taylor's size, the referee was dismissed from the Olympic tournament and banned from international officiating. In the Greco-Roman competition, Taylor was unexpectedly suplexed and pinned by a much lighter Wilfried Dietrich, whom he defeated a week before in the freestyle contest.

Round 2

Round 3

Round 4

Final 

Results from the preliminary round are carried forward into the final (shown in yellow).

Final standings 
 
 
 
 ,  and

References

External links
Official Report

Greco-Roman 99kg